State Correctional Institution – Mahanoy is a 1,000 cell, all male, Medium-Security, correctional facility located along Interstate 81 in Schuylkill County, Pennsylvania.

Construction of SCI-Mahanoy
Mahanoy was one of four 1,000-bed medium-security correctional facilities constructed in Pennsylvania around the same time. The facility cost $117 Million to construct and is on a 222-acre tract of land that was originally leased by the county commissioners. Construction began in July 1991 and the prison opened two years later.

Notable inmates
 Joshua Komisarjevsky, convicted in the Cheshire, Connecticut, home invasion murders
 Mark Canty, convicted in the Murder of Lauretha Vaird
 David Freeman, convicted in the Freeman family murders
 Mumia Abu-Jamal, convicted of the murder of Daniel Faulkner
 Robert Nauss, convicted of the murder of Elizabeth Lande

See also

 List of Pennsylvania state prisons

References

External links
 Penna. Department of Corrections - SCI Mahanoy

Prisons in Pennsylvania
Buildings and structures in Schuylkill County, Pennsylvania
1993 establishments in Pennsylvania